Neal Hutcheson (born 1969) is an American filmmaker, photographer, and author. He has received three regional Emmy Awards for documentaries on regional culture, language, and identity. He has produced 17 television documentaries on topics such as Appalachian culture, heritage fisheries on the North Carolina Outer Banks, Cherokee language preservation efforts, African American vernacular speech, and climate change. Hutcheson’s most visible work has featured Popcorn Sutton, a moonshiner from Western North Carolina. The Moonshiner Popcorn Sutton, a book of photos, interviews and essays by Hutcheson, was released in 2021 and received a National Indie Excellence Award and the Outstanding Book—Independent Spirit Award from The Independent Publisher Book Awards, the largest unaffiliated book contest in the world, and was the grand prize winner of the 30th Annual Writer's Digest Self-Published Book Awards. Hutcheson works as a producer for the Language & Life Project at North Carolina State University and is a contributing producer to independent production companies Empty Bottle Pictures and Sucker Punch Pictures.

Selected filmography 
 The Prison Sutras (documentary short, 1997)
 Jornada del Muerto (documentary short, 1998)
 Indian by Birth—The Lumbee Dialect (documentary short, 1999)
 Mountain Talk (2004)
 Voices of North Carolina (2005)
 The Queen Family—Appalachian Tradition and Back Porch Music (documentary short, 2006)
 The Prince of Dark Corners (2007)
 The Carolina Brogue (documentary short, 2008)
 The Outlaw Lewis Redmond (2008)
 The Last One—Moonshine in Appalachia (2009)
 Core.Sounders—Living from the Sea (2013)
 Popcorn Sutton—A Hell of a Life (2014)
 First Language—The Race to Save Cherokee (Neal Hutcheson, Danica Cullinan, 2016)
 Talking Black in America (Neal Hutcheson, Danica Cullinan, 2019)
 Signing Black in America (Danica Cullinan, Neal Hutcheson, 2020)
 Land and Water Revisited / Revisitando Tierra y Agua (Kirk French, Elijah Hermitt, Neal Hutcheson, 2021)
 Talking Black in America—Roots (2022)

Author 
 “Smoky Mountain English: If These Hills Could Talk.”
 “Gary Carden: Folklorist, Playwright, and Storyteller.” (North Carolina Folklore Journal, 2006)
 “Inclemented that Way.” (Jonathan Williams: The Lord of Orchards, 2017)
 “Negotiating Language Presentation: Linguists, Communities, and Producers.”
 The Moonshiner Popcorn Sutton (2021)

Honors 
 Artist’s Fellowship, North Carolina Arts Council, 2005
 The Bill Arnold North Carolina Filmmaker Award, 2008 Carolina Film and Video Festival
 Emmy, Best Cultural Documentary, 2009, Southeast region
 Brown-Hudson Folklore Award, North Carolina Folklore Society, 2011
 Emmy Nomination, Best Cultural Documentary, 2013 Midsouth region
 Best Public Service Film Award, 2015 American Indian Film Festival
 Best Regional Film, 2015 Native American Film Festival of the Southeast
 Audience Award, 2015 Red Rock Film Festival
 Emmy, Best Cultural Documentary, 2015, Midsouth region
 Emmy, Best Cultural Documentary, 2019, Midsouth region
 Emmy Nomination, Best Cultural Documentary, 2021, National Capital Chesapeake Bay region
 2022 Outstanding Book — Independent Spirit Award, Independent Publisher Book Awards
 2022 National Indie Excellence Award, 16th Annual National Indie Excellence Awards
 Grand Prize Winner, 30th Annual Writer's Digest Self-Published Book Awards, 2022.

References 

Emmy Award winners

Living people
1969 births